Sako or SAKO may refer to:

People with the surname
 Bakary Sako (born 1988), French-born Malian footballer
 Hygerta Sako, Albanian beauty pageant contestant
 Louis Raphaël I Sako (born 1948), Iraqi cleric, head of the Chaldean Catholic Church
 Masato Sako (1946–2003), Japanese actor
 Morike Sako (born 1981), French footballer
 Kenichi Sako (born 1970), Japanese basketball player
 Sevkaretsi Sako (1870–1908), Armenian revolutionary
 Tomohisa Sako (born 1991), a Japanese singer
 Yago Alonso-Fueyo Sako (born 1979), Côte d'Ivoire-born Equatoguinean footballer
 Yugo Sako (c.1928–2012), Japanese film maker

Other uses
 SAKO (programming language), a Polish 1950s programming language
 Sako Station, a railway station in Japan
 SAKO, a Finnish firearm manufacturer
 A diminutive form of the Armenian male name Sargis/Sarkis